USC School of Law may refer to: 

 University of South Carolina School of Law 
 University of Southern California Law School